Elayne is a female given name of French origin, which means "light". The name  is a variant of Elaine, Elaina, and Helen .  

Elayne may refer to:

People
Elayne Angel, American professional body piercer 
Elayne Arrington, American mathematician and engineer
Elayne Boosler (born 1952), American comedian 
Elayne Brenzinger (born 1951), Canadian politician
Elayne Cortois, Belgian beauty queen
Elayne Rapping (born 1938), American writer 
Elayne Reiss-Weimann (born 1933), American teacher and writer

Fictional characters 
Elayne Trakand, a character in Robert Jordan's The Wheel of Time series of novels

See also
Elaine (given name)
Elena (given name)

Feminine given names